The Glee cast has released sixteen soundtrack albums, six compilation albums and eleven extended plays (EPs), containing 754 different performances of an individual song or a mashup of two or more songs in a single performance. Of the performances on the various albums and EPs, 460 were also released as singles. Glee features on-screen performance-based musical numbers, most of which are cover versions of popular songs, with genres ranging from R&B and pop to country and show tunes. The cast consists of fifteen main characters; some actors were cast following Broadway theatre experience while others were required to audition to prove singing and dancing capabilities. Recordings of performances on the show are sold as singles the week of broadcast, available for download.

For the first season, the group's debut album, Glee: The Music, Volume 1, was released by Columbia Records in November 2009, and peaked at number one in Ireland and the United Kingdom, three in Australia, and four in Canada and the United States. The album eventually went on to earn platinum certifications in these five countries, plus double platinum in Australia and triple platinum in Ireland. Debut single "Don't Stop Believin', a cover of the 1981 Journey song, was a top ten hit, reaching number two in the UK and number four in Ireland and the US; it has since been certified platinum in the US and Australia. In December 2009, their second album, Glee: The Music, Volume 2, reached number one in New Zealand and Ireland. The EP Glee: The Music, The Power of Madonna saw release in April 2010 to accompany a Madonna tribute episode, and marked the cast's first number-one debut on the Billboard 200. Glee: The Music, Volume 3 Showstoppers was released in May 2010 and managed to debut in the top ten worldwide. Included on the track listing is a cover of The All-American Rejects' "Gives You Hell", which reached number one in Ireland, a first for the group. The season's releases concluded with an EP of the music from the season's final episode, Glee: The Music, Journey to Regionals, which reached number one on the US and Ireland charts, number two in the UK and Canada, and number three in Australia. Glee: The Music, The Complete Season One was a compilation album, which contained all one hundred studio recordings from the first season released on the first three volumes (Volume 1, Volume 2, and Volume 3 Showstoppers) and the first two extended plays (The Power of Madonna and Journey to Regionals), including bonus tracks. All singles from the first season were also included, with the exception of "Last Christmas". The album was released to the iTunes Store on September 14, 2010.

For the second season, the first release was the EP Glee: The Music, The Rocky Horror Glee Show, released to accompany the Rocky Horror tribute episode; it reached number six in the US in October 2010. Glee: The Music, The Christmas Album and Glee: The Music, Volume 4 were both released in November 2010; the former accompanies the last episode of the year. These albums both charted in the top ten in Canada and the US, and are the only two albums to have been certified platinum from the season, with the former achieving that in the US, and the latter in Australia. A limited edition EP Glee: The Music, Love Songs, sold only at Target stores, was released at the end of the year, and did not chart. Three more soundtracks albums, Glee: The Music, Volume 5, Glee: The Music Presents the Warblers, and Glee: The Music, Volume 6, were released for the season in 2011, all reaching the top five in Canada and the US. The cast holds the record for most charted songs by an act in the 53-year history of the Billboard Hot 100, with 207 appearances as of October 2013. Two singles, "Teenage Dream" and "Loser Like Me", charted in the top ten in the US and Canada, and both were certified gold in the US. The cast has also put 51 singles in the top 40 on the Billboard Hot 100, and are ahead of The Beatles as of October 2013, behind only Lil Wayne with 64, Elton John with 57 and Elvis Presley with 80. As of April 2013, the cast has sold more than 53 million songs and over 13 million albums worldwide including 45.2 million downloads and 7.9 million albums sold in the U.S. alone as of March 2015.

Albums

Soundtrack albums

Compilation albums

EPs

See also
Lists of songs in Glee
List of Billboard Hot 100 chart achievements and milestones

Notes

References

General

Specific

External links 
 
 

 
Discographies of American artists
Glee discographies
Pop music discographies